Beijing Henrey Automobile Technology Co., Ltd. (also known as Henrey Automobile) is an battery electric vehicle company. It was founded in Beijing Zhongguancun Science and Technology Park in May 2010.

Henrey automobile has three subsidiaries: Henan Henrey Automobile Co., Ltd., Yantai Henrey Automobile Co., Ltd. and Xuchang Herun electromechanical Co., Ltd.

Timeline
 In 2012, Henan Henrey Shiying Vehicle Co., Ltd. was established as a vehicle production base.
 In 2013, Xuchang Herun Electromechanical Co., Ltd. was established as a core parts production base.
 In 2018, Yantai Henrey Automobile Co., Ltd. was established as a light body production base.

Range
 Xiaohu FEV (Family Electric Vehicle), available in both 3 and 5-door configurations.

References

Electric vehicle manufacturers of China
Chinese brands
Car brands